Lyle Pearce Lovett (born November 1, 1957) is an American singer, songwriter, actor and record producer. Active since 1980, he has recorded 13 albums and released 25 singles to date, including his highest entry, the number 10 chart hit on the U.S. Billboard Hot Country Songs chart, "Cowboy Man". Lovett has won four Grammy Awards, including Best Male Country Vocal Performance and Best Country Album. His most recent album is 12th of June, released in 2022.

Early life
Lovett was born in Houston, Texas, when his family lived in the nearby community of Klein. He is the son of William Pearce and Bernell Louise (née Klein) Lovett, a marketing executive and training specialist, respectively. He was raised in the Lutheran Church–Missouri Synod. Lovett attended Texas A&M University, where he received Bachelor of Arts degrees in both German and Journalism in 1980. In the early 1980s, Lovett often played solo acoustic sets at the small bars just off the A&M campus.

Career
Lovett began his music career as a singer-songwriter. By the early 1980s, Lovett had already distinguished himself in the burgeoning Texas folk acoustic scene.  He had performed in the New Folk competition at the Kerrville Folk Festival in 1980 and 1982. An American singer, Buffalo Wayne, whom he had met in 1978 during a college trip to Germany, invited Lovett to play with him at the 1983 Schueberfouer in Luxembourg. One of the events at the funfair was an American musical tent.  The owner of that event was a fan of the Phoenix, Arizona, house band J. David Sloan and the Rogues. He invited the Rogues for the event, and Lovett was encouraged by band members Ray Herndon and Matt Rollings to sit in with the group, which did some of his songs. They opened his eyes to what his songs could sound like with proper backing; Lovett had never sung with a band before. Sloan and band member Billy Williams offered Lovett a deal on studio time, first day free. In 1984 Lovett took them up on the offer. After several stays in Arizona over that summer he recorded 18 songs. The demo tape of the first four songs led to his first record deal; ten of those songs, recorded with the Rogues, became Lovett's self-titled debut album. He made many longtime contacts in Arizona during that time.  Several of the Rogue players, Herndon, Matt McKenzie, Rollings, and Williams, went on to play in his band. Williams produced or co-produced several of his albums from 1987 to 2007. Through them he met Francine Reed, who began recording with him in 1985 and toured with him for decades.  In 2022, reliving his Phoenix connection:It led to a demo tape, an album and now, this rolling Thanksgiving tour...It's all because of running into this band in Luxembourg. That's a long way to get to Phoenix from Texas. It's a lot shorter if you just do I–10

He signed with MCA Records in 1986 and released his eponymous debut album. He sang harmony vocals on Nanci Griffith's The Last of the True Believers album (1986). While typically associated with the country genre, Lovett's compositions often incorporate folk, swing, blues, jazz and gospel music as well as more traditional country & western styling. He has won four Grammy Awards, including Best Country Album (1996 for The Road to Ensenada), Best Country Duo/Group with Vocal (1994 for "Blues For Dixie" with the Texas swing group Asleep at the Wheel), Best Pop Vocal Collaboration (1994 for "Funny How Time Slips Away" with Al Green) and Best Country Male Vocal (1989 for Lyle Lovett and His Large Band). In 1995, Lovett performed a duet of "You've Got a Friend in Me" with Randy Newman for Toy Story. He plays Collings acoustic guitars.

Lovett has acted in a number of films, notably four for director Robert Altman: The Player (1992), Short Cuts (1993), Prêt-à-Porter (1994), and Cookie's Fortune (1999). He also composed the score for the director's Dr. T & the Women (2000).  Some of his other film roles include Bastard Out Of Carolina (1996), The New Guy (2002), Walk Hard: The Dewey Cox Story (2007), and a humorous role in Angels Sing, a family Christmas movie (alongside fellow actors and musicians such as Harry Connick, Jr., Connie Britton, Willie Nelson, and Kris Kristofferson). His television acting forays include guest roles on Mad About You and Castle, a recurring role on The Bridge (as Flagman, a lawyer), and appearances as himself on Dharma & Greg and Brothers & Sisters.

Mary Chapin Carpenter's 1992 song "I Feel Lucky" makes reference to Lovett, as does Bloodhound Gang's 1999 song "The Bad Touch", which includes the lyric, "and you'll Lovett just like Lyle."

Lovett was given an award called an "Esky" for Surest Thing in Esquire's 2006 Esky Music Awards in the April issue. The magazine said of Lovett: "The secret of Lyle Lovett's endurance comes down to the three C's: class, charisma and consistency... In the studio and on stage with his giant orchestra, he's spent two decades gracefully matching genuine songcraft with A-list musicianship".

In 2010, Lovett appeared on an episode of Spectacle: Elvis Costello with... that also featured John Prine and Ray LaMontagne.

In 2011, Lovett was named Texas State Artist Musician by the Texas Commission on the Arts.

Lovett contributed a cover of Buddy Holly's "Well... All Right" for the tribute album Listen to Me: Buddy Holly, released on September 6, 2011.

On October 24, 2019, Lovett was inducted into the Austin City Limits Hall of Fame.

Personal life

Lovett married actress Julia Roberts after meeting her on the set of The Player. Following a three-week romance, they eloped and married in June 1993 in Marion, Indiana. In March 1995, they divorced after less than two years of marriage. People magazine reported that the breakup was caused by career demands. They remained friends afterwards.

Since late 1997, Lovett has been in a relationship with April Kimble. They became engaged in 2003. They were married on February 4, 2017, in Harris County, Texas. Their twins, a boy and a girl, were born that year.

On March 28, 2002, Lovett was trapped by a bull against a fence on his uncle's farm in Klein, Texas, before being pulled to safety. He fully recovered after six months from a badly broken leg, and he began touring again in summer 2003.

Lovett was conferred the honorary degree of Doctor of Humane Letters by the University of Houston on May 15, 2010, at its general commencement ceremony. His mother was in the audience as her son was presented with an honorary doctorate from the same university from which she had received her bachelor's degree in 1960. His father was also a graduate of the Gerald D. Hines College of Architecture of the University of Houston.

In 2015, Lovett received the Distinguished Alumnus Award from Texas A&M University.

Lovett is also a horse enthusiast and co-owns and competes in reining competitions with world class Quarter Horse, Smart and Shiney. In 2012, Lovett was inducted into the Texas Cowboy Hall of Fame. In 2018, he was awarded the National Reining Horse Association Lifetime Achievement Award in the National Reining Horse Association Hall of Fame.

Discography

Lyle Lovett (1986)
Pontiac (1987)
Lyle Lovett and His Large Band (1989)
Joshua Judges Ruth (1992)
I Love Everybody (1994)
The Road to Ensenada (1996)
Step Inside This House (1998)
My Baby Don't Tolerate (2003)
It's Not Big It's Large (2007)
Natural Forces (2009)
Release Me (2012)
12th of June (2022)

Filmography

Musician
 Still Alice (2014) — song performer "If I Had A Boat"; songwriter for Karen Elson's performance of same
 The Bridge (TV series, 2014)
 True Blood (TV series, episode "I Will Rise Up", 2009) — song performer "I Will Rise Up"
 Walk Hard (2007) — song performer "Walk Hard"
 Deadwood (TV series, episode "Bullock Returns to the Camp", 2005) — song performer "Old Friend" (1994)
 The Exonerated (TV movie, 2005) — song performer "Amazing Grace"
 The Interpreter (2005) — song performer "If I Had a Boat"
 61* (TV movie, 2001) — song performer "Nobody Knows Me"
 All Over the Guy (2001) — song performer and composer "She Makes Me Feel Good" and "The Blues Walk"
 Dr. T & the Women (2000) — Song performer and composer and also used a recording of "You've Been So Good Up to Now" (1992), "She's Already Made Up Her Mind" (1992), "Ain't It Something" (1994)
 For Love of the Game (1999) — song performer "Summer Wind"
 Stuart Little (1999) — song performer "Walking Tall"
 Mumford (1999) — song performer "Ballad of the Snow Leopard and The Tanqueray Cowboy", "Till It Shines"
 Clay Pigeons (1998) — song performer "Teach Me About Love"
 Hope Floats (1998) — song performer "Smile"
 The Apostle (1997) — song performer "(I'm a) Soldier in the Army of the Lord"
 Toy Story (1995) — song performer "You've Got a Friend in Me" with Randy Newman as the lead vocals.
 Beverly Hills, 90210 (TV series, episode "One Wedding and A Funeral", 1995) — song performer "Nobody Knows Me"
 Quiz Show (1994) — song performer "Moritat" by Kurt Weill
 With Honors (1994) — song performer "Blue Skies"
 Major League II (1994) — song performer and composer "All My Love Is Gone"
 The Firm (1993) — song performer "M-O-N-E-Y"
 Leap of Faith (1992) — song performer "Pass Me Not"
 The Crying Game (1992) — song performer "Stand By Your Man"
 Major League (1989) — song performer "Cryin' Shame"
 Always (1989) — song performer "Cowboy Man"

Actor

Theatre

Actor
 Much Ado About Nothing (The Shakespeare Center of Los Angeles, 2010) – Balthazar

Composer
 Much Ado About Nothing (The Shakespeare Center of Los Angeles, 2010)

Honors

Grammy Awards 
The Grammy Awards are awarded annually by the National Academy of Recording Arts and Sciences. Lovett has won four awards from 17 nominations.

|-
|rowspan=2|1989
|"She's No Lady"
|Best Country Song
|
|-
|Pontiac
|rowspan=2|Best Male Country Vocal Performance
|
|-
|1990
|Lyle Lovett and His Large Band
|
|-
|rowspan=2|1993
|Joshua Judges Ruth
|Best Male Pop Vocal Performance
|
|-
|"Church"
|Best Music Video
|
|-
|rowspan=3|1995
|I Love Everybody
|Best Pop Album
|
|-
|"Funny How Time Slips Away" (with Al Green)
|Best Pop Collaboration
|
|-
|"Blues for Dixie" (with Asleep at the Wheel)
|Best Country Performance by a Duo or Group with Vocal
|
|-
|rowspan=3|1997
|"Private Conversation"
|Best Male Country Vocal Performance
|
|-
|"Long Tall Texan" (with Randy Newman)
|Best Country Collaboration with Vocals
|
|-
|The Road to Ensenada
|Best Country Album
|
|-
|1999
|Step Inside This House
|Best Contemporary Folk Album
|
|-
|2000
|"That's Right (You're Not from Texas)"
|rowspan=3|Best Male Country Vocal Performance
|
|-
|2002
|"San Antonio Girl"
|
|-
|rowspan=2|2004
|"My Baby Don't Tolerate"
|
|-
|My Baby Don't Tolerate
|Best Country Album
|
|-
|2005
|"In My Own Mind"
|Best Male Country Vocal Performance
|

Citations

Sources
 Oermann, Robert K. (1998). "Lyle Lovett". In The Encyclopedia of Country Music. Paul Kingsbury, Editor. New York: Oxford University Press. p. 307.

External links

Official Lyle Lovett Website
Lyle Lovett at Lost Highway Records

"Lovett charges ahead with his career" – USA Today, May 10, 2002.
"Homeboy", by Alec Wilkinson, The New Yorker, February 1, 2004.
"The Thinking Man's Cowboy", by Matt Dellinger, The New Yorker, February 23, 2004.

1957 births
American blues singers
American country singer-songwriters
American jazz singers
American Lutherans
American rockabilly guitarists
American male singer-songwriters
American people of German descent
Americana Music Honors & Awards winners
Country musicians from Texas
Curb Records artists
Fast Folk artists
Grammy Award winners
Klein High School alumni
Living people
Lost Highway Records artists
MCA Records artists
Musicians from Houston
People from Klein, Texas
Singer-songwriters from Texas
Swing revival musicians
Texas A&M University alumni
Volpi Cup winners
Western swing performers